The Lxd2 is a B′B′ narrow gauge diesel-hydraulic locomotive of the Polish state railway Polskie Koleje Państwowe (PKP), produced in Romania by FAUR (former 23 August Works).

The locomotives are nearly indistinguishable on the exterior, with the only differences being with the engines inside. The first of these locomotives started service in 1968 on the Upper Silesian Narrow Gauge Railways, replacing heavily worn-out Tw47 and Tw53 steam locomotives.

Usage 

PKP purchased a total of 165 Lxd2 locomotives, 111 of which were for the 750mm gauge (inventory numbers from 239 to 349), 25 for 785mm track (numbers 351 to 375) and 29 for 1000mm track (numbers 451 to 479). They were designated as Lxd2, meaning a four axle diesel locomtovie with a diesel engine and hydraulic transmission

B′B′ locomotives
Diesel locomotives of Poland
FAUR locomotives
750 mm gauge locomotives
785 mm gauge locomotives
Metre gauge diesel locomotives